Rabiul Alam Kiran Khan is a Awami League politician and the former Member of Parliament of Dhaka-23.

Career
Khan was elected to parliament from Dhaka-23 as an Awami League candidate in 1973.

Death
Khan was shot and killed on 28 April 1986. On 10 May 2014, one person was sentenced to death for his murder but the convict had died before the verdict was declared.

References

Awami League politicians
1986 deaths
Assassinated Bangladeshi politicians
1st Jatiya Sangsad members
1986 murders in Bangladesh